Joel Dudley is currently Associate Professor of Genetics and Genomic Sciences and founding Director of the Institute for Next Generation Healthcare at the Icahn School of Medicine at Mount Sinai. In March, 2018 Dr. Dudley was named Executive Vice President for Precision Health for the Mount Sinai Health System (MSHS). In 2017 he was awarded an Endowed Professorship by Mount Sinai in Biomedical Data Science. Prior to Mount Sinai, he held positions as Co-founder and Director of Informatics at NuMedii, Inc. and Consulting Professor of Systems Medicine in the Department of Pediatrics at Stanford University School of Medicine. His work is focused at the nexus of -omics, digital health, artificial intelligence (AI), scientific wellness, and healthcare delivery. His work has been featured in the Wall Street Journal, Scientific American, MIT Technology Review, CNBC, and other popular media outlets. He was named in 2014 as one of the 100 most creative people in business by Fast Company magazine. He is co-author of the book Exploring Personal Genomics from Oxford University Press. Dr. Dudley received a BS in Microbiology from Arizona State University and an MS and PhD in Biomedical Informatics from Stanford University School of Medicine.

Selected publications

2017

2016

2015 

Google Scholar Citations

https://scholar.google.com/citations?user=206DEM0AAAAJ

References

External links
 Flywall.com (with photograph)
 Mountsinai.org
 http://www.nextgenhealthcare.org

21st-century American biologists
Living people
Year of birth missing (living people)
Icahn School of Medicine at Mount Sinai faculty